Sadler may refer to:

 Sadler (surname), people with the surname Sadler
 James Sadler and Sons Ltd English pottery manufacturer
 Sadler, Kentucky, United States; an unincorporated community
 Sadler, Texas, United States; a city
 Sadler report, 19th century British report on child labor

See also
 Saddler (disambiguation)
 Sadleir (disambiguation)

pt:Sadler